Amole Gupte (born c. 1962) is an Indian screenwriter, actor, and director, known for his work on the 2007 Bollywood film Taare Zameen Par (Like Stars on Earth) as creative director and screenwriter. He conceived the film along with his wife, Deepa Bhatia (concept, research, and editing). He was the chairperson of the Children's Film Society, India from 2012 to 2015. And presently serves as a member of the advisory board of the Kautik International Student Film Festival.

Filmography

Director

Actor
Mumbai Saga (2021)
 Sniff (2017)
 Ek Tara (2015)
 Singham Returns (2014)
 Bheja Fry 2 (2011) 
 Stanley Ka Dabba (2011)
 Urumi (2011)
 Phas Gaye Re Obama (2010)
 Kaminey (2009)
 Jo Jeeta Wohi Sikandar (1992)
 Holi (1984)

Awards
2008 Apsara Film & Television Producers Guild Awards
Won: Best Story – Taare Zameen Par (Like Stars on Earth)
Won: Best Screenplay – Taare Zameen Par (Like Stars on Earth)

2010 Apsara Film & Television Producers Guild Awards 

 Nominated: Best Actor in a Negative Role – Kaminey

2008 Filmfare Awards
Won: Best Story – Taare Zameen Par (Like Stars on Earth)

2010 Filmfare Awards 
Nominated: Best Supporting Actor – Kaminey
2010 IIFA Awards
Nominated: Best Villain – Kaminey

2008 Screen Awards
Won: Best Story – Taare Zameen Par (Like Stars on Earth)
Won: Best Dialogue – Taare Zameen Par (Like Stars on Earth)

2010 Screen Awards 

 Nominated: Best Villain – Kaminey
 Nominated: Most Promising Newcomer – Male – Kaminey

2008 Zee Cine Awards
Won: Best Story – Taare Zameen Par (Like Stars on Earth)

2010 Stardust Awards 

 Nominated: Breakthrough Performance – Male – Kaminey

2008 V. Shantaram Awards
Won: Best Writer – Taare Zameen Par (Like Stars on Earth)

2010 V. Shantaram Awards 
Nominated: Best Supporting Actor – Kaminey

Further reading
Vij, Gauri. "." The Hindu, 3 February 2008.
Anurag Kashyap. "TAARE ZAMEEN PE- not a review." , 18 December 2007.

Notes

External links
 

Indian male screenwriters
Living people
Filmfare Awards winners
Male actors in Malayalam cinema
Indian male film actors
1962 births
21st-century Indian male actors
Male actors from Mumbai
Film directors from Mumbai
21st-century Indian dramatists and playwrights
21st-century Indian film directors
Hindi-language film directors
Hindi screenwriters
Screenwriters from Mumbai
21st-century Indian male writers
21st-century Indian screenwriters